Andrew Jackson, named after the seventh president of the United States, is an unincorporated community in Tallapoosa County, Alabama, United States, located on the west bank of the Tallapoosa River,  east of Alexander City.

References

Unincorporated communities in Tallapoosa County, Alabama
Unincorporated communities in Alabama